Charith Sylvester Fernando (born December 30, 1982) in Badulla is a Sri Lankan first class cricketer. Debuting in 2001, Sylvester is a left-handed wicket-keeper batsman. He made his Twenty20 debut on 17 August 2004, for Sinhalese Sports Club in the 2004 SLC Twenty20 Tournament.

See also
 List of Chilaw Marians Cricket Club players

References

External links
 

1982 births
Living people
Basnahira South cricketers
Sinhalese Sports Club cricketers
Chilaw Marians Cricket Club cricketers
Sri Lankan cricketers
North Central Province cricketers
Sri Lanka Schools XI cricketers
Panadura Sports Club cricketers
Colombo Cricket Club cricketers
Wicket-keepers